Access Bank may refer to:

 Access Bank Group, a multinational financial services company, with headquarters in Nigeria and subsidiaries in eight sub-Saharan African countries and the UK:
 Access Bank plc, a commercial bank in Nigeria
 Access Bank Ghana, a commercial bank in Ghana
 Access Bank Rwanda, a commercial bank in Rwanda
 Access Bank Zambia, a commercial bank in Zambia

See also
 Access Bank Nigerian Government Bond Index